Dizaj Rural District is in the Central District of Khoy County, West Azerbaijan province, Iran. At the National Census of 2006, its population was 17,516 in 3,673 households. There were 19,493 inhabitants in 5,019 households at the following census of 2011. At the most recent census of 2016, the population of the rural district was 19,681 in 5,380 households. The largest of its 44 villages was Badalabad, with 9,256 people.

References 

Khoy County

Rural Districts of West Azerbaijan Province

Populated places in West Azerbaijan Province

Populated places in Khoy County